The Dehwar are an ethnic group of the Balochistan region of Pakistan and Iran. They have traditionally been settled agriculturalists (in contrast to the nomadic Baloch). They speak Dehwari a variety of Persian close to Dari and Tajik. The may be descendants of settled local populations predating the Baloch migration. In the Khanate of Kalat from the 17th century and later, the community was the source of recruits for the state's bureaucracy.

Bibliography 
 Available online in two parts part 1 and part 2.

Iranian ethnic groups
Social groups of Balochistan, Pakistan
Ethnic groups in Iran